Dol pri Šmarjeti is a small settlement in the  historical region of Lower Carniola in southeastern Slovenia. It lies in the Municipality of Šmarješke Toplice, which is included in the Southeast Slovenia Statistical Region.

Name
The name of the settlement was changed from Dol to Dol pri Šmarjeti in 1953.

Unmarked grave
Dol pri Šmarjeti is the site of an unmarked grave from the Second World War. The Dol pri Šmarjeti Grave is located on a hilly slope in a woods 100 m east of the road from Šmarjeta to Mokronog, north of the hamlet of Preloge. It contains the remains of 13-year-old boy that was shot by the Partisans in 1942 for allegedly spying for German forces.

References

External links
Dol pri Šmarjeti at Geopedia

Populated places in the Municipality of Šmarješke Toplice